Melbourne Kestrels were an Australian netball team that represented Netball Victoria in the Commonwealth Bank Trophy. Between 1997 and 2007, together with Melbourne Phoenix, they were one of two teams to represent Netball Victoria in the Commonwealth Bank Trophy era. In 2008, when the Commonwealth Bank Trophy was replaced by the ANZ Championship, Kestrels and Phoenix merged to form Melbourne Vixens.

Final placings

Home venues
Kestrels played their home games at the State Netball and Hockey Centre and at the Waverley Netball Centre.

Notable players

Internationals

 Abby Sargent

CBT MVP

CBT Best New Talent

Head coaches

Sponsorship

References

 
Defunct netball teams in Australia
1997 establishments in Australia
Sports clubs established in 1997
2007 disestablishments in Australia
Sports clubs disestablished in 2007
Commonwealth Bank Trophy teams
!
Kestrals
Sport in the City of Melbourne (LGA)